The Škoda Kamiq is a subcompact crossover SUV that was designed and built in China by the SAIC-Volkswagen joint venture of the Czech car manufacturer Škoda Auto.

Overview 
The Škoda Kamiq in China was introduced at the 2018 Beijing Auto Show in April 2018, and launched in June 2018, positioned below the Škoda Karoq compact crossover SUV. This version is slightly larger than the European version. A single engine variant is offered: a 1.5-litre  with a 6-speed automatic transmission.

Just like the Škoda Kodiaq GT, a sportier version called the Škoda Kamiq GT was available from 2019, featuring a redesigned front fascia and sleeker rear body section. The Kamiq GT has the same 1.5 liter engine as the regular Kamiq and an additional 1.2-litre TSI  engine with a 6-speed automatic or 7-speed DSG transmission. 

Škoda Kamiq

Škoda Kamiq GT

Sales

References

External links 

 Official website (China)

Cars introduced in 2018
Cars of China
Crossover sport utility vehicles
Front-wheel-drive vehicles
Mini sport utility vehicles
Kamiq (China)
2020s cars